Megachile subsericeicauda is a species of bee in the family Megachilidae. It was described by Rayment in 1939.

References

Subsericeicauda
Insects described in 1939